History of the Tatars may refer to:

 History of Tatarstan
 History of the Tartars (disambiguation)